Jonathan Ford or Jon Ford may refer to:

Politicians
Jon Ford (Australian politician) (born 1958), Australian politician
Jon Ford (American politician) (born 1972), Indiana State Senator

Sportspeople
Jon Ford (footballer) (born 1968), English former footballer
Johnathon Ford (born 1989), Australian rugby league footballer
Jonathan Ford (American football) (born 1998), American football player
Lew Ford (Jon Lewis Ford, born 1976), Major League Baseball outfielder

Fictional characters
Commander Jonathan Ford, a character on the American TV series seaQuest DSV
Professor Jon Ford, a character on the British TV series The Innocence Project

See also
Ford (surname)
John Ford (disambiguation)